Tamás Erdélyi may refer to:
 Tommy Ramone (born Tamás Erdély), musician and member of the Ramones
 Tamás Erdélyi (mathematician)